Noah Hawley (born ) is an American director, producer, and writer for television and film who created and wrote the FX television series Fargo (2014–present) and Legion (2017–2019). Hawley earlier worked on the television series Bones (2005–2008), The Unusuals (2009), and My Generation (2010), and wrote the film The Alibi (2006). He also wrote and directed the film Lucy in the Sky (2019). He is set to create a new television series based on the Alien film franchise. In addition to his work in film and television, he has also written six novels.

Early life
Hawley was born and raised in New York City. His mother, Louise Armstrong, was a non-fiction writer and activist, and his maternal grandmother was a playwright. His father, Tom Hawley, was a businessman. He has a twin brother, Alexi, who has written for the television shows The Following and Castle and is the creator of State of Affairs, The Rookie, and The Recruit.

Hawley graduated from Sarah Lawrence College with a degree in political science in 1989. He worked for the Legal Aid Society in New York City, dealing with cases involving child abuse and neglect. He later moved to San Francisco. He worked in computer programming at law firms and as a paralegal.

Career

Books
He has published six novels: A Conspiracy of Tall Men (1998), Other People's Weddings (2004), The Punch (2008), The Good Father (2012), Before the Fall (2016), and Anthem (2022), plus one non-fiction work, Fargo: This is a True Story (2019).

Television

Hawley was a writer and producer on the first three seasons of the television series Bones (2005–2008). He was also creator and executive producer of The Unusuals (2009) and My Generation (2010).

Hawley is the creator, primary writer, and executive producer of the FX anthology television series Fargo (2014), based on the Coen brothers' 1996 film of the same name. On August 25, 2014, Fargo won the Primetime Emmy Award for Outstanding Miniseries, along with 17 additional nominations at the 66th Primetime Emmy Awards. In total, the series has been nominated for 113 awards since its premiere, winning 32 of them. The fourth season of Fargo premiered on September 27, 2020.

In December 2015, Hawley extended his production deal with FX. He wrote and served as executive producer for Legion, an FX television series based on the Marvel comic book character.

On December 10, 2020, it was announced that Hawley will be creating a television series based on the Alien franchise for FX, for which he will serve as the showrunner, primary writer, and executive producer. The show is scheduled to be released sometime in 2023.

Film 
Hawley wrote the original screenplay for the film The Alibi (2006).

In September 2014, Hawley signed a deal with Universal Pictures to script an untitled project for their upcoming Dark Universe. Sony Pictures has acquired the rights to Hawley's novel, Before the Fall, with him writing the screenplay. In 2016, his 26 Keys production company signed a deal with 20th Century Fox to do films.

On July 20, 2017, Hawley announced at Comic Con that he was writing and directing a Doctor Doom movie with 20th Century Fox. However, the project was shelved following Disney's acquisition of 21st Century Fox.

In 2019, he made his feature film directorial debut with Lucy in the Sky, a drama film starring Natalie Portman as an astronaut, for Fox Searchlight.

In November 2019, it was announced that Hawley would be writing and directing the fourth installment in the rebooted Star Trek franchise. He finished the script in September 2020. It would feature a new crew, although set in the same universe. In late November 2020, the project was cancelled and Hawley had left.

Personal life
Hawley resides in Austin, Texas and Los Angeles, California, with his wife, Kyle Hawley, and their two children.

Filmography
Television

Film

Published works

Awards and nominations

References

External links

1967 births
American male screenwriters
Television producers from New York City
American television writers
Living people
Writers from New York City
Showrunners
Sarah Lawrence College alumni
20th-century American novelists
21st-century American novelists
American television composers
American twins
Primetime Emmy Award winners
Golden Globe Award winners
American male novelists
American male television writers
20th-century American male writers
21st-century American male writers
Novelists from New York (state)
Screenwriters from New York (state)
Edgar Award winners